Dear Class of 2020 was a 2020 online event streamed live on June 7, 2020 on YouTube. It was a virtual commencement event that features speeches and performances from prominent personalities aimed at graduating students of all levels whose actual ceremonies were cancelled due to the COVID-19 pandemic. The event also highlighted the ongoing protests following the murders of George Floyd and Ahmaud Arbery, and the shooting of Breonna Taylor. Originally scheduled on June 6, the event was rescheduled the day after to avoid clashing with the memorial service for George Floyd held on that date in Raeford, North Carolina.

Appearances

Commencement speakers

YouTube creators

 Merrell Twins
 Mr. Kate
 AsapScience
 Mark Rober
 Unjaded Jade and Folkert
 The Try Guys
 Emma Chamberlain
 Jackie Aina
 Dude Perfect
 Nikkie de Jager
 Prajakta Koli
 Zane and Heath

Words of encouragement

 Alicia Keys
 Justin Timberlake
 Homer, Marge, Bart, and Lisa Simpson (voiced by Dan Castellaneta, Julie Kavner, Nancy Cartwright, and Yeardley Smith)
 Liza Koshy
 Shawn Mendes
 Taylor Swift
 Billie Eilish
 Bono
 Missy Elliott
 Jimmy Kimmel
 Colin Jost
 Tom Hanks and Rita Wilson
 La La Anthony
 Ray Allen
 Chris Cassidy
 Jenna Bush Hager
 John Green
 Joseph Gordon-Levitt
 Stephen Colbert
 Jennifer Lopez
 Kerry Washington
 Ian Book
 Phoebe Robinson
 Michael B. Jordan
 D-Nice
 Antoni Porowski
 The cast of Euphoria
 Storm Reid
 Barbie Ferreira
 Angus Cloud
 Zendaya
 Jacob Elordi
 Dwyane Wade and Gabrielle Union
 Bill and Melinda Gates
 Jack Black
 Hasan Minhaj
 Andy Cohen
 Kaia Gerber and Cindy Crawford
 Keegan-Michael Key
 Martha Stewart
 Snoop Dogg
 Katelyn Ohashi
 Natalie Morales
 Lana Condor
 Tom Brady
 Russell Westbrook
 Michael Strahan
 Russell Wilson and Ciara
 Peyton Manning
 Billy Porter
 Camila Mendes
 John Mulaney
 Demi Lovato
 CNCO
 Jake Gyllenhaal
 Courtney A. Kemp
 Rupi Kaur
 Seth Rogen
 Evan Goldberg
 J. J. Abrams

Performers

Notes

References

External links

June 2020 events in the United States
YouTube Premium original programming
Cultural responses to the COVID-19 pandemic